Hwali is a village in Hwali ward in the province of Matabeleland South, Zimbabwe. It is located south-east of Gwanda on the road to Tuli.

It is located approximately 111 km from Gwanda and is a rapidly growing business centre

For more nhwali news visit Nhwali information centre on Facebook

Populated places in Matabeleland South Province